Andrew W. Murray is a British-born American evolutionary biologist known for his research on budding yeast. He is the Herchel Smith Professor of Molecular Genetics and a Howard Hughes Medical Institute Professor at Harvard University. He was elected to the American Academy of Arts and Sciences in 2000 and to the National Academy of Sciences in 2014.

References

External links
Faculty page

Living people
American molecular biologists
Evolutionary biologists
Alumni of Clare College, Cambridge
Harvard Medical School alumni
Harvard University faculty
University of California, San Francisco faculty
Members of the United States National Academy of Sciences
Fellows of the American Academy of Arts and Sciences
Year of birth missing (living people)